The following lists events that happened during 1971 in New Zealand.

Population
 Estimated population as of 31 December: 2,898,500
 Increase since 31 December 1970: 46,400 (1.63%)
 Males per 100 females: 99.7

Incumbents

Regal and viceregal
Head of State – Elizabeth II
Governor-General – Sir Arthur Porritt Bt GCMG GCVO CBE.

Government
The 36th Parliament of New Zealand continued, with the second National government in power.
Speaker of the House – Roy Jack.
Prime Minister – Keith Holyoake
Deputy Prime Minister – Jack Marshall.
Minister of Finance – Robert Muldoon.
Minister of Foreign Affairs – Keith Holyoake.
Attorney-General – Jack Marshall until 2 February, then Dan Riddiford.
Chief Justice — Sir Richard Wild

Parliamentary opposition
 Leader of the Opposition –   Norman Kirk (Labour).

Main centre leaders
Mayor of Auckland – Dove-Myer Robinson
Mayor of Hamilton – Mike Minogue
Mayor of Wellington – Frank Kitts
Mayor of Christchurch – Ron Guthrey then Neville Pickering
Mayor of Dunedin – Jim Barnes

Events

January

February

March

April
The Tiwai Point Aluminium Smelter starts production.

June

July

August
 18 August – The nation's first Kentucky Fried Chicken (KFC) restaurant opens in Royal Oak, Auckland, beginning a decade of American fast food chains being established in New Zealand.

September
 The Manapouri Power Station, the country's largest hydroelectric facility, is completed. It wouldn't export any electricity until April 1972 when transmission lines to Invercargill were completed.

October
 25 October – The Christchurch to Dunedin overnight express becomes the last revenue steam locomotive-hauled train service, as the New Zealand Railways completes dieselisation.

November

December

Arts and literature
Noel Hilliard wins the Robert Burns Fellowship.

See 1971 in art, 1971 in literature

Music

New Zealand Music Awards
Loxene Golden Disc  Craig Scott – Smiley
Loxene Golden Disc  Chapta – Say A Prayer

See: 1971 in music

Performing arts

 Benny Award presented by the Variety Artists Club of New Zealand to Pat McMinn OBE.

Radio and television
  In 1971 there was a major breakthrough for international news when the Warkworth Satellite station was opened. 
 The Melbourne Cup was the first live international broadcast, in November.
 The radio licence fee was abolished, and the television fee set at NZ$20 per year.
Feltex Television Awards:
Best Programme: Gallery and In View of the Circumstances
Best Actor: Bruno Lawrence in Time Out
Best Performance as Frontman: Brian Edwards in Post Office Dispute
Best Entertainment: Dinah Lee
TVPDA Award for Allied Crafts: Waynne Williams

See: 1971 in New Zealand television, 1971 in television, List of TVNZ television programming, :Category:Television in New Zealand, :Category:New Zealand television shows, Public broadcasting in New Zealand

Film
See: :Category:1971 film awards, 1971 in film, List of New Zealand feature films, Cinema of New Zealand, :Category:1971 films

Sport

Athletics
 David McKenzie wins his third national title in the men's marathon, clocking 2:17:16.4 on 6 March in Invercargill.

Chess
 The 78th National Chess Championship is held in Nelson, and is won by R.J. Sutton of Auckland (his second title).

Horse racing

Harness racing
 New Zealand Trotting Cup: True Averil
 Auckland Trotting Cup: Garcon Roux

Soccer
 New Zealand National Soccer League won by Eastern Suburbs AFC
 The Chatham Cup is won by Western Suburbs FC of Wellington who beat Wellington City 3–2 in the final.

Births
 23 January: Adam Parore, cricketer.
 5 March: Cory Hutchings, surf livesaving and ironman competitor.
 29 March: Julie Seymour, netball player.
 11 April: Mark Cooksley, rugby union player.
 12 April: Greg Russ, field hockey player.
 28 April: Hamish Carter, triathlete.
 2 June: Dion Gosling, field hockey player.
 11 June: Mark Richardson, cricketer
 18 June: Blair Pocock, cricketer.
 20 June: Josh Kronfeld, rugby union player.
 25 June: Paul Gibbons, pole vaulter.
 9 August: Jon Toogood, musician, songwriter.
 15 August: Umesh Parag, field hockey player.
 18 August: Jonathan Winter, swimmer.
 24 August: Heremaia Ngata, soccer player.
 27 August: Glen Osborne, rugby union player.
 15 September: Nathan Astle, cricketer.
 18 September: Tom Larkin, musician.
 20 September: Todd Blackadder, rugby union player.
 8 October: Marc Ellis, rugby union and rugby league player, television personality.
 20 October: Rachel House, actress and comedian
 25 October: Martin Leslie, rugby union player.
 31 October: Phil Tataurangi, golfer.
 20 November: Dion Nash, cricketer.
 30 November: Heath Davis, cricketer.
 13 December: Vaughan Coveny, soccer player.
 20 December: Simon O'Neill, opera singer.
 24 December: Geoff Allott, cricketer.
:Category:1971 births

Deaths
 16 January: Harold Abbott, rugby union player.
 12 March: Robert Laidlaw, businessman.
 28 March: Miriam Soljak, feminist and activist
 24 June: Jack Dunning, cricketer.
 13 July: R. A. K. Mason, poet.
 19 September: Ted Badcock, cricketer.
 10 October: John Cawte Beaglehole, historian and biographer.
 15 December: Air Marshall Roderick Carr
 22 December: Mary Grigg, politician.

References

See also
List of years in New Zealand
Timeline of New Zealand history
History of New Zealand
Military history of New Zealand
Timeline of the New Zealand environment
Timeline of New Zealand's links with Antarctica

 
New Zealand
Years of the 20th century in New Zealand